This is a list of notable Twitter services and applications. Twitter's ecosystem of applications and clients crossed one million registered applications in 2011, up from 150,000 apps in 2010. These Twitter apps were built by more than 750,000 developers around the world. A new app is registered every 1.5 seconds, according to Twitter. These various services and applications are designed to work with or enhance the microblogging service Twitter. They are designed with various goals – many aim to improve Twitter's functionality while others set out to make the service more accessible, particularly from other devices. Some applications allow users to send messages (called tweets) directly while others give users the ability to create more complex tweets which they then have to manually post through Twitter itself.

Table

References

Lists of software add-ons

Services and applications